Eritrea competed at the 2019 World Aquatics Championships in Gwangju, South Korea from 12 to 28 July.

Swimming

Eritrea entered two swimmers.

Men

References

Nations at the 2019 World Aquatics Championships
Eritrea at the World Aquatics Championships
World Aquatics Championships